Warangal Airport also Mamnoor Airport  is located at Mamnoor, Warangal in the state of Telangana, India. The largest airport at the time, remained in service until 1981. The Government of Telangana is trying to revive the airport with some instate services. Around  of land are available for the proposed airport.

History
Warangal Airport, the largest pre-independence era airport, was built at  Mamnoor in Warangal district, in 1930. It was commissioned by the last Nizam, Mir Osman Ali Khan, along with one at Solapur, to benefit the businesses, at Kagaznagar for the paper industry's convenience, and to help industries like the Azam Zahi mills at Warangal.
Numerous PMs and Presidents have landed at the airport until 1981, and during the Indo-China war, it served as a hangar for government aircraft due to Delhi airport being a target in combat. Many cargo services and Vayudoot services have also used it as their hub.

Infrastructure

Airlines and destinations 
No scheduled commercial air service at this time.

The Airports Authority of India has included Warangal airport in the list of under-served and unserved airports, suitable for the regional connectivity scheme.

Revival plans 
In September 2020, the Government of Telangana planned to acquire 200 acres of additional land around the airport for its revival. The state government also requested the Ministry of Civil Aviation for the airport to be included in the Government of India's UDAN scheme. In October 2022, Government of Telangana allocated another    to Airports Authority of India (AAI) for the airport. Already,    has been allocated by the government.

New push is made for warangal airport to be revived via the UDAN scheme.

See also
 List of airports in Telangana
 Rajiv Gandhi International Airport

References

External links
 Warangal Airport

Airports in Telangana
Proposed airports in Telangana
Transport in Warangal